Dasht-e Khowrdeh (also known as Dasht-e Kharzeh) is a village in Sarvestan Rural District, in the Central District of Bavanat County, Fars Province, Iran. At the 2006 census, its population was 45, in 11 families.

References 

Populated places in Bavanat County